The  is an electric multiple unit (EMU) train type operated by the Metropolitan Intercity Railway Company on the Tsukuba Express line in the Kantō region of Japan since 2005. A total of 84 cars were delivered.

Design
TX-1000 series trains are used only on the Akihabara – Moriya section of the Tsukuba Express line, which is electrified at 1,500 V DC. (Services running through to the 20 kV AC section beyond Moriya to Tsukuba are operated by dual-voltage TX-2000 series sets only.)

Formation

Car 2 is fitted with one single-arm pantograph and car 4 is fitted with two.

Interior
All seating is arranged longitudinally, allowing more standing passengers in the metropolitan area.

History
The first 6-car prototype was built in March 2003 by Kawasaki Heavy Industries, and 13 more sets were subsequently delivered between March 2004 and January 2005.

References

External links

 Tsukuba Express TX-1000 information 
 Kawasaki Heavy Industries product information 

Electric multiple units of Japan
1000 series
Kawasaki multiple units
1500 V DC multiple units of Japan